The Australian national cricket team toured South Africa from January to March 1970, and played a four-match Test series against the South African national cricket team. South Africa won the Test series 4–0. Australia were captained by Bill Lawry and South Africa by Ali Bacher.

It was the last official Test series to involve South Africa for 22 years,  and the 1970 South African team has been held to be one of the greatest in the history of cricket.

Squads

Test series summary

First Test

Second Test

Third Test

Fourth Test

See also 
 Australian cricket team in Ceylon and India in 1969–70 (31 October – 28 December 1969) immediately preceding the trip to South Africa

References

External links
 Australia tour of South Africa 1969-70 on ESPNcricinfo

1970 in Australian cricket
1970 in South African cricket
Australian cricket tours of South Africa
International cricket competitions from 1960–61 to 1970
South African cricket seasons from 1945–46 to 1969–70